The Temple of Hercules Gaditanus, Temple of Melqart or Temple of Hercules-Melqart was a place of worship in Antiquity in the southern outskirts of Gadir-Gades (current-day Cádiz) perhaps dating as early as the 8th century BCE. Operating under Tyrian, Carthaginian and Roman rule, it once was one of the most important sanctuaries in the Western World. It was paid respect by the likes of Hannibal, Scipio Africanus and Caesar. 

It was initially dedicated to Phoenician god Melqart and then to Hercules.

References 
Informational notes

Citations

Bibliography
 
 
 

Lost buildings and structures
Buildings and structures in the Province of Cádiz
Ancient history of the Iberian Peninsula
Phoenician temples
Roman temples in Spain